This is a list of active and extinct volcanoes in Eritrea.

References 

Eritrea
 
Volcanoes